The School District of the City of Pontiac (or Pontiac School District, PSD) is a public school district headquartered in the Odell Nails Administration Building in Pontiac, Michigan, United States.

The school district serves all of the city of Pontiac, portions of Auburn Hills, Lake Angelus and Sylvan Lake as well as segments of the townships of Bloomfield, Orion, Waterford, and West Bloomfield.

The 2021 Board of Education consists of - Gill Garrett - President, Kenyada Bowman - Vice-President, William A. Carrington - Trustee, Caroll Y. Turpin - Trustee, Shaquana Davis-Smith-Treasurer, Michael McGuinness -Secretary and Kevin Groce - Trustee. Kelley Williams is the Superintendent.

The 2019 Board of Education consists of - William A. Carrington - President, Sherman Williams II – Vice-President, Caroll Y. Turpin - Secretary, Shaquana Davis-Smith - Trustee, Kenyada Bowman - Trustee,  Mike McGuinness - Trustee and Kerry Tolbert - Trustee. Kelley Williams is the Superintendent.

History

In the 1960s the student body increased and the school district used high salaries to recruit teachers as the automobile industry economy prospered.

A February 1970 court order from federal judge Damon J. Keith ordered racial integration effective fall 1970 to ameliorate de facto racial segregation. According to the court order, no more than 40% of each school was to be African-American. The busing was to affect 10,000 students. In August 1971 several school buses were bombed with dynamite, and ten men were indicted in charges related to the incidents; one of them was an ex-Ku Klux Klan Grand Dragon in the state. On October 25, 1971 the U.S. Supreme Court decided not to hear an opposition to the court order, keeping it in effect.

The busing order contributed to area racial tensions. That, along with an increase in unemployment, a loss of political support for school taxation due to an increase of the average age of the residents, financially harmed the district. As of 1981 20% of the area's residents were 65 and older, and a total of 58% of the community residents were at least 46 years of age; residents voted down tax millage proposals on eight occasions during the years 1979 to 1981. There was a 23% unemployment rate as of 1981. From 1972 to circa 1982 the enrollment declined from 21,028 to 17,216. In 1981 extracurricular activities were sharply reduced, and several athletes left the district due to the loss of athletic programs; they attended public schools in other school districts and private schools.

In June 2013 the Michigan Education Association's health insurance division stated that it was owed $11 million in premiums from the Pontiac district, so it planned to end benefits for teachers of the district on July 31 of that year; according to a lawsuit settlement, taxpayers in the district were required to pay $7.8 million of it. Administrators, secretaries, and teachers had been paying over 20% of their health care premiums out of pocket.

On Wednesday July 3, 2013 the state of Michigan conducted a preliminary review of the district, and the result was an indication of "probable financial stress". Governor of Michigan Rick Snyder stated that he was going to have a full review of the district conducted by a team appointed by him.

Demographics
In 1971 the district had 24,000 students, with 32% of them being black. In 1972-1973 there were 21,028. In the 1980-1981 school year the student body numbered 18,099. This declined to 17,216 students in 1982, with 27% of the students receiving welfare and a total of 37% of students qualifying for free or reduced lunches, a sign of poverty. A principal of an elementary school, Mattie McKinney, stated to the Associated Press that, in the agency's words, "The district's poverty is unusually striking this school year", and she directly stated that she had encountered more poverty in her students than she had previously. The district enrollment was projected to further decrease after 1982.

School uniform
All students are required to wear school uniforms. The school board considered adding uniforms in 2009.

Schools
Grades 9-12
Pontiac High School
International Technology Academy High School
Grades 7-8
Pontiac Middle School
Grades 6-8
International Technology Academy
Grades K-6
Alcott Elementary School
Herrington Elementary School
Jefferson/Whittier Elementary School
Owen Elementary School
Rogers Elementary School
Whitman Elementary School
WHRC Elementary School
Preschool
Frost Preschool (P.E.A.C.E Academy) 
Other campuses
Kennedy Center

Former schools
 Pontiac Central High School
 Pontiac Northern High School

By December 2008 administrators were making plans to consolidate Pontiac Northern and Central high schools.

See also

List of school districts in Michigan

References

External links
Pontiac School District – Official site.

Schools in Pontiac, Michigan
Schools in Auburn Hills, Michigan
School districts in Michigan
Education in Oakland County, Michigan